Mohammad Nizamuddin Ahmed (born c. 1960) was an admiral in the Bangladesh Navy and the former Chief of Naval Staff. He previously served as the Director of Coast Guard Operations and commander of Chittagong Naval Command (COMCHIT). He also served in Naval Headquarters as Director of Personnel Services and Secretary to the Chief of Naval Staff. Inter Service Public Relations Directorate (ISPR) announced Ahmed's nomination to succeed Admiral Farid Habib. Ahmed began serving as the 15th Chief of Naval Staff on 27 January 2016.

Biography

Early life
Nizam was born in Madaripur, Dhaka in 1960. His father, Late M.A Rashid, was a teacher and his mother late Fazilatunnesa Rashid was a housewife. He spent his childhood in Madaripur, where he attended local schools.

Education
He attended Madaripur United Islamia Government High School, where he obtained first division with four letters in 1976. He later attended Madaripur Government Nazimuddin College. After joining  the Navy, he graduated from Marshal Tito NAval Academy in Yugoslavia. He also obtained degree in Inter Forces Staff Course from France, United States and Canada. Admiral Nizam visited a wide range of countries in the world. He can fluently speak and write in French, and Serbo-Croatian language. Admiral Nizam also completed NDC at the National Defence College, Mirpur.

Military service
Admiral Nizam joined Bangladesh Navy on 30 January 1979 and was commissioned on 1 August 1981. During long career span, Ahmed served in the Naval Headquarter as Director of Personnel Services and Secretary to the Chief of Naval Staff. As specialist, he also served as the Instructor of TAS School as well as in Bangladesh Naval Academy. He was the Director of Operations at Bangladesh Coast Guard Headquarters. Admiral Nizam also got the responsibility of selecting the officers of Armed Forces while holding the appointment of Deputy President of ISSB. Admiral Nizam Commanded Torpedo boats, Minesweepers, Gun boats and various Patrol Craft. He had the proud privilege of commanding all the three Ex-RN frigates. He also commanded various bases and subsequently took over the command of the biggest area of Bangladesh Navy at Chittagong. He served more than two years as Area Commander and earned the commendation from the Chief of Naval Staff. He participated in the peacekeeping mission in Ivory Coast during the time of tense situation as Military Observer.

As the chairman of Chittagong Port Authority
Admiral Nizam joined Chittagong Port Authority as Chairman on 26 February 2012 and has served successfully till to date. As the Chairman Chittagong Port Authority he took lot of initiative and opened the first Inland Container Terminal of the country at Pangao near Dhaka. It is worth to mention that Chittagong Port was not closed for a single day due to labour unrest or strike during his tenure. Admiral Nizam did put up his best efforts to establish the country's much-needed third Sea Port (PAYRA) in the southern region of the country.

Honours

References

|-

Living people
1960s births
Chiefs of Naval Staff (Bangladesh)
People from Madaripur District
Bangladeshi Navy admirals